The A91 is a major road in Scotland, United Kingdom. It runs from St Andrews to Bannockburn, via Cupar. Along the way, the road runs adjacent to parts of the St. Andrews Old Course and Jubilee golf courses into Guardbridge. Past Guardbridge is Clayton Caravan Park. Further towards Cupar is the Eden Valley & Prestonhall Industrial Estates, home to such businesses as Cupar Garden Centre, Hoggs, Fishers Services and many others. Further down the A91 the road runs adjacent to the major A-road, the A92.

The A91 connects four areas: Stirlingshire, Clackmannanshire, Perthshire and Fife and a section of it is broken up by the M90 motorway near Kinross only to re-emerge and continue bound for Stirling or St Andrews depending on destination.

At Bannockburn the A91 emerges from the M9/M80 Pirnhall junction and skirts the urban area around Stirling and en route to St Andrews passes through Clackmannanshire villages and towns including Alva and Dollar. The road also features a Junction with an unusual layout at Yetts 'O Muckhart.

External links

9-0091